"Like Ooh-Ahh" (stylized as "Like OOH-AHH") is the debut single recorded by South Korean girl group Twice. It was released by JYP Entertainment on October 20, 2015, as the lead single from their debut extended play The Story Begins. It was written and composed by Black Eyed Pilseung and Sam Lewis.

Composition

"Like Ooh-Ahh" is described as a "color pop" dance track with elements of hip-hop, rock, and R&B. The composition team included Black Eyed Pilseung and lyricist Sam Lewis, known for producing successful releases such as Miss A's "Only You".

Music video
On October 20, 2015, the song's music video was released on JYP Entertainment's YouTube Channel. It was directed by production team Naive (Kim Young-jo and Yoo Seung-woo).

The video begins with Twice in a run-down hospital filled with zombies. However, the members barely notice them and continue dancing and singing through the halls, the roof, a bus, and leading to a space eventually with the zombies themselves. It ends as one of the zombies hearing his own heartbeat and slowly turning back into a human.

On November 11, 2016, it hit 100 million views on YouTube, making Twice the fourth K-pop girl group to reach this milestone, as well as the first debut music video to do so. Twice became the first K-pop female act to have three music videos with 200 million views each, as "Like Ooh-Ahh" achieved this view count by November 2 the following year.

Commercial performance

"Like Ooh-Ahh" debuted at number 22 on Gaon's Digital Chart until it reached its peak position at number 10, three months after its release. It also peaked at number 6, 27 and 49 on Billboard charts' World Digital Song Sales, Billboard Japan Hot 100, and Philippine Hot 100, respectively.

"Like Ooh-Ahh" surpassed 100 million streams in February 2017 and 2,500,000 downloads in July 2018 on Gaon Music Chart.

Japanese version
On February 24, 2017, Twice officially announced that their debut in Japan was set for June 28. They released a compilation album titled #Twice which consists of ten songs including both Korean and Japanese-language versions of "Like Ooh-Ahh". The Japanese lyrics were written by Yhanael.

Charts

Weekly charts

Year-end charts

Certifications

|-

References

2015 songs
2015 debut singles
Korean-language songs
JYP Entertainment singles
Twice (group) songs